The capture of the schooner Bravo was a naval battle fought in 1819 between United States Revenue Cutter Service cutters and one of Jean Lafitte's pirate ships.

In early 1819, the two U.S. Revenue Cutters  and  had just been constructed in New York City at a cost of $4,500 each. The two sister ships, each equipped with a single pivot gun in the 9- to 18-pounder range, were dispatched to the Gulf of Mexico to conduct counter-piracy patrols. Alabama was assigned to the Mobile Squadron and Louisiana assigned to the New Orleans Squadron.

In August 1819, Alabama was temporarily assigned to New Orleans to help thwart the pirate incidents in those waters with Louisiana. On 31 August, the two ships were sailing the Gulf off southern Florida when they sighted the schooner Bravo. The Americans gave chase and eventually came within firing range. Bravo resisted and a brief gunnery duel occurred, in which the first officer and three crew members of Louisiana were wounded. The Americans then boarded Bravo and the pirates were captured. Jean La Farges, who commanded the suspected privateer, was a lieutenant of French pirate Jean Lafitte. Apparently no letter of marque was presented to the Americans, which explained why the pirates fled at the sight of the Revenue Cutter schooners.

In the following years, more battles occurred between United States naval forces and pirates in the Gulf of Mexico and the Caribbean. On 19 April 1819, Alabama and Louisiana destroyed a pirate base at the Patterson's Town Raid on Breton Island, Louisiana. Another action was fought on 10 July 1820 when the Captain of Louisiana captured four pirate ships off Belize.

Fate
Louisianas career was soon over. In March 1824 she was put up for public auction. Alabama eventually went on to fight the slave trade in the Atlantic until she was sold in Florida on 6 August 1833.

See also
Barbary Wars
Operation Enduring Freedom – Horn of Africa

References

 Official U.S. Coast Guard history page
Donald Canney. U.S. Coast Guard and Revenue Cutters, 1790-1935.  Annapolis, MD: Naval Institute Press, 1995.
U.S. Coast Guard.  Record of Movements: Vessels of the United States Coast Guard: 1790 - December 31, 1933.  Washington, DC: U.S. Government Printing Office, 1934–1989

Bravo
History of Louisiana
United States Revenue Cutter Service
19th-century military history of the United States
August 1819 events